Cordillera del Piuchén is one of the two mountain ranges located on Chiloé Island, in southern Chile. It is located along the Pacific Coast, and is part of the Chilean Coast Range System.

Its northern boundary is the Chacao Channel, while to the south it is separated from the Pirulil Range by Cucao Lake.

The vegetation in the uplands of Cordillera del Piuchén is made up of Magellanic moorland.

See also
Cordillera de Oncol
Cordillera Pelada
San Pedro Wind Farm

References

Chilean Coast Range
Mountain ranges of Chile
Landforms of Los Lagos Region